Lysipomia acaulis is a species of flowering plant in the family Campanulaceae. It is endemic to Ecuador, where it occurs in the high Andes. Its habitat includes mountain forest and páramo. There are five known subpopulations. It grows on the slopes of the volcano Cotopaxi.

References

aculis
Endemic flora of Ecuador
Vulnerable plants
Páramo flora
Taxonomy articles created by Polbot